The 1954 Minnesota lieutenant gubernatorial election took place on November 2, 1954. Minnesota Democratic-Farmer-Labor Party candidate Karl Rolvaag defeated Republican Party of Minnesota challenger P. Kenneth Peterson.

Results

External links
 Election Returns

Minnesota
Lieutenant Gubernatorial
1954